The Thompson Fish House, Turtle Cannery and Kraals is a historic site located at 200 Margaret Street, Key West, Florida, United States.  On June 23, 1994, it was added to the U.S. National Register of Historic Places.

The kraals were fenced-in holding pens adjacent to the cannery in a sheltered bay at the north end of town,  where turtles were kept awaiting slaughter.  The once-fashionable turtle meat was canned and sold to cooks who used it largely to make turtle soup. The valuable  Tortoiseshell was used to make many kinds of products made today from plastic.

The building is owned by the City of Key West, and currently houses exhibits from the nearby Mel Fisher Maritime Heritage Museum.  The Turtle Kraals Museum, which educated the public about dangers to sea turtles, was formerly located at this site.

References

External links

 Monroe County listings at National Register of Historic Places
 Florida's Office of Cultural and Historical Programs
 Monroe County listings
 Turtle Kraals Museum

Buildings and structures in Key West, Florida
Landmarks in Key West, Florida
History of Key West, Florida
National Register of Historic Places in Key West, Florida
Tourist attractions in Key West, Florida
1918 establishments in Florida
Buildings and structures completed in 1918